Obrecht is a patronymic surname. Obrecht was a Germanic given name derived from Od-brecht, meaning "famed for his heritage". Notable people with the surname include:

Jacob Obrecht (c. 1457/58 – 1505), Flemish Renaissance composer
Hermann Obrecht (1882–1940), Swiss politician
André Obrecht (1899–1985), French executioner

See also 
Obrecht Pyramid

Patronymic surnames